is a Japanese gravure idol, television and film actress, singer and voice actress. She debuted in 2009 and is affiliated with Sony Music Artists, which distributes and sells her records.

Filmography

Television
 - Urara (Pinky Macaron: Emerald Destiny)

Films

Discography

Radio
Gekidan Samba Carnival

References

External links
Rino Higa on Idolex

1992 births
Living people
Japanese television personalities
People from Okinawa Island
Musicians from Okinawa Prefecture